Noah Meier (born September 24, 2002) is a Swiss professional ice hockey defenseman who is currently playing with the GCK Lions of the Swiss League (SL) as a prospect to the ZSC Lions of the National League (NL).

Playing career
Meier made his professional debut during the 2019–20 season with the GCK Lions of the Swiss League (SL). He also made his National League (NL) debut that same season with the ZSC Lions, appearing in 3 games. On April 3, 2020, Meier signed his first professional contract, agreeing to a three-year deal with the ZSC Lions.

Meier was assigned to the GCK Lions for the start of the 2020–21 season.

International play
Meier was named to Switzerland's U20 national team for the 2021 World Junior Championships in Edmonton, Canada. He scored 1 goal and picked up 1 assist in 4 games as Switzerland failed to reach the 1/4 finals for the first time in 5 years.

Career statistics

International

References

External links

Living people
2002 births
GCK Lions players
Swiss ice hockey defencemen
Ice hockey people from Zürich
ZSC Lions players